De casibus virorum illustrium (On the Fates of Famous Men) is a work of 56 biographies in Latin prose composed by the Florentine poet Giovanni Boccaccio of Certaldo in the form of moral stories of the falls of famous people, similar to his work of 106 biographies De Mulieribus Claris.

Overview
De casibus is an encyclopedia of historical biography and a part of the classical tradition of historiography. It deals with the fortunes and calamities of famous people starting with the biblical Adam, going to mythological and ancient people, then to people of Boccaccio's own time in the fourteenth century. The work was so successful it spawned what has been referred to as the De casibus tradition, influencing many other famous authors such as Geoffrey Chaucer, John Lydgate, and Laurent de Premierfait. De casibus also inspired character figures in works like The Canterbury Tales, The Monk's Tale, the Fall of Princes (c. 1438), Des cas de nobles hommes et femmes (c. 1409), and Caida de principles (a fifteenth-century Spanish collection), and A Mirror for Magistrates (a very popular sixteenth-century continuation written by William Baldwin and others).

Development
Boccaccio wrote the core of his work from about 1355 to 1360 with revisions and modifications up to 1374. For almost four hundred years this work was the better known of his material. The forceful written periodic Latin work was far more widely read then the now famous vernacular  Tuscan/Italian tales of Decameron. The Renaissance period saw the secular biography development which was spearheaded partly by the success of this work being a stimulus and driving force of the new biography-moral genre.

Purpose
Boccaccio's perspective focuses on the disastro awaiting all who are too favoured by luck and on the inevitable catastrophes awaiting those with great fortune. He offers a moral commentary on overcoming misfortune by adhering to virtue through a moral God's world. Here the monastic chronicle tradition combines with the classical ideas of Senecan tragedy.

Content
De casibus stems from the tradition of exemplary literature works about famous people. It showed with the lives of these people that it was not only biographies, but also snapshots of their moral virtues. Boccaccio relates biographies of famous people who were at the height of happiness and fell to misfortune when they least expected it. This sad event is sometimes referred to as a "de casibus tragedy" after this work. William Shakespeare created characters based on this phenomenon, as did Christopher Marlowe.

Lives recounted 

In order, directly translated from Latin.

Book One
Adam and Eve
Nembroth
Saturn
Cadmus, King of Thebes
Jocasta, Queen of Thebes
Thyestes and Atreus
Theseus, King of Athens
Priam, King of Troy, and his wife Hecuba
Agamemnon, King of Mycenae
Samson

Book Two
 Saul, King of Israel
 Rehoboam, King of the Hebrews
 Athaliah, Queen of Jerusalem
The Hebrews
Dido, Queen of Carthage
 Sardanapalus, King of Assyria
 Zedekiah, King of Jerusalem
 Astyages, King of Media
 Croesus, King of the Lydians

Book Three
Tarquinius the Great, King of the Romans
Xerxes I, King of the Persians
Appius Claudius, the decemvir
Alcibiades the Athenian
Hannibal of Carthage
Artaxerxes, King of the Persians

Book Four
Marcus Manlius Capitolinus
Dionysius of Syracuse
Polycrates, tyrant of Samos
Callisthenes the Philosopher
Alexander of Egypt
Darius, King of the Persians
Eumenes, ruler of Cappadocia and Paphlagonia
Olympias, Queen of Macedonia
Agathocles, King of Sicily
Arsinoe, Queen of Macedonia
Pyrrhus, King of Egypt
Arsinoe, Queen of Crete

Book Five
Seleucus and Anthiocus, Kings of Asia and Syria
Marcus Atilius Regulus
Syphax, King of Numidia
Anthiocus the Greater, King of Asia and Syria
Hannibal, leader of Carthage
Prusia, King of Bithynia
Perseus, King of Macedonia
Pseudo-Philip of Macedonia
Alexander Balas, King of Syria
Demetrius, King of Syria
Alexander Zebenna, King of Syria
Jugurtha, King of the Numidians

Book Six
Gaius Marius of Arpinum
Cleopatra
Mithridates, King of Pontus
Orodes, King of Parthia
Gnaeus Pompeius Magnus
Marcus Tullius Cicero
Marcus Antonius the Triumvir and Cleopatra

Book Seven
Herod, King of the Jews
Tiberius Caesar, Gauis Caligula and Valeria Messalina
Nero Claudius Caesar
Aulis Vitellius Caesar

Book Eight
Francesco Petrarch, the most illustrious author
Valerian Augustus, the Roman Emperor
Zenobia, Queen of the Palmyrene Empire
Diocletian, the Roman Emperor
Maximian Hercules, the Western Roman Emperor
Galerius Maximianus
Julian the Apostate
Radagaisus, King of the Goths
King Arthur of the Bretons
Rosamund, Queen of the Lombards

Book Nine
Maurice, Roman emperor
Muhammad
Brunhilda of Austrasia
Heraclius
Constantine III
Gisulf II of Friuli and Romilda
Justinian II
Philippikos Bardanes
Desiderius
Pope Joan
Pope John XII
Charles, Duke of Lower Lorraine
Romanos IV Diogenes
Andronikos I Komnenos and Isaac II Angelos
Robert Guiscard
Guy de Lusignan
Henry (VII) of Germany
Charles of Anjou
Hetum I of Armenia
Ugolino della Gherardesca
Pope Boniface VIII
Knights Templar
Philip IV of France and his sons
Walter VI of Brienne
Philippa of Catania (and her husband, Raimondo de' Cabanni)
Sancho of Majorca
Louis I of Naples
Jean II of France

See also
The Monk's Tale
On Famous Women
The Legend of Good Women
The Book of the City of Ladies
The Fall of Princes

References

Primary sources
Des cas des nobles hommes et femmes translated from Boccaccio's De Casibus Virorum Illustribus by Laurent de Premierfait (1400) 
Tutte le Opere de Giovanni Boccaccio ed., Vittore Branca (Verona: Arnoldo Mondadori, 1964)
The Fates of Illustrious Men, trans. Louis Brewer Hall (New York, Frederick Ungar Publishing, 1965)
 Çoban, R. V. (2020). The Manzikert Battle and Sultan Alp Arslan with European Perspective in the 15st Century in the Miniatures of Giovanni Boccaccio's "De Casibus Virorum Illustrium"s 226 and 232. French Manuscripts in Bibliothèque Nationale de France. S. Karakaya ve V. Baydar (Ed.), in 2nd International Muş Symposium Articles Book (pp. 48-64). Muş: Muş Alparslan University. Source

Secondary sources
Miscellanea di Studi e Ricerche sul Quattrecento francese, ed., F. Simone (Turin: Giappichelli, 1966)
Des cas des nobles hommes et femmes ed., Patricia May Gathercole, Chapel Hill - University of North Carolina (1968)

Related references
Christine de Pizan, The Book of the City of Ladies (1405)
Egan, Margarita trans. The Vidas of the Troubadours, New York, Garland (1984)
Joinville, Jehan de Vie de saint Louis, ed., Noel L. Corbert. Sherbrook Naoman (1977) 
Richards, Earl Jeffery trans. The Book of the City of Ladies, New York, Persea (1982)
Lalande, Denis, ed., Le livre des fais du bon messiere Jehan le Maingre, dit Bouciquaut Geneva: Droz (1985)

Footnotes

External links
 MS 439/16 Fall of princes at OPenn

Latin biographies
Books about Nero
Works by Giovanni Boccaccio
14th-century Latin books